The Arnold Arboretum of Harvard University is a botanical research institution and free public park, located in the Jamaica Plain and Roslindale neighborhoods of Boston, Massachusetts. Established in 1872, it is the oldest public arboretum in North America. The landscape was designed by Charles Sprague Sargent and Frederick Law Olmsted and is the second largest "link" in the Emerald Necklace. The Arnold Arboretum's collection of temperate trees, shrubs, and vines has a particular emphasis on the plants of the eastern United States and eastern Asia, where arboretum staff and colleagues are actively sourcing new material on plant collecting expeditions. The arboretum supports research in its landscape and in its Weld Hill Research Building.

History

The Arboretum was founded in 1872 when the President and Fellows of Harvard College became trustees of a portion of the estate of James Arnold (1781–1868), a whaling merchant from New Bedford, Massachusetts. Arnold specified that a portion of his estate was to be used for "...the promotion of Agricultural, or Horticultural improvements". According to the deed of trust between the Arnold trustees and the college, income from Arnold's legacy was to be used for establishing, developing and maintaining an arboretum to be known as the Arnold Arboretum, which "shall contain, as far as practicable, all the trees [and] shrubs ... either indigenous or exotic, which can be raised in the open air of West Roxbury." The historical mission of the Arnold Arboretum is to increase knowledge of woody plants through research and to disseminate this knowledge through education.

Benjamin Bussey (1757–1842), a prosperous Boston merchant and scientific farmer, donated his country estate Woodland Hill and a part of his fortune to Harvard University "for instruction in agriculture, horticulture, and related subjects". Bussey had inherited land from fellow patriot Eleazer Weld in 1800 and further enlarged his large estate between 1806 and 1837 by acquiring and consolidating various farms that had been established as early as the seventeenth century. Harvard used this land for the creation of the Bussey Institute, which was dedicated to agricultural experimentation. The first Bussey Institute building was completed in 1871 and served as headquarters for an undergraduate school of agriculture.

In June 1872 Charles Sprague Sargent was appointed as a professor of horticulture and the curator of the Arnold Arboretum; the following year he was appointed director of both the Arnold Arboretum and the Harvard Botanic Garden. In 1877, Sargent commissioned the landscape architect Frederick Law Olmsted to prepare a road and pathway system. Sargent and Olmsted would delineate the collection areas by family and genus, following the then-current and widely accepted classification system of Bentham and Hooker. The Hunnewell Building was designed by architect Alexander Wadsworth Longfellow, Jr. and constructed in 1892, with funds donated by H. H. Hunnewell. The Weld Hill Research Building opened in 2011 and has been awarded LEED Gold certification.

The Arboretum has a long history of supporting plant exploration in North America, East Asia, and elsewhere. Ernest Henry Wilson was among the Arboretum's most prolific collectors in the first fifty years. He led six collecting expeditions to Eastern Asia (primarily China, Japan, and Korea) between 1899 and 1919. Many of Wilson's plants still grow in the Arboretum landscape today. In 2015, the Arboretum staff launched a 10-year collecting campaign, prioritizing the collection of nearly 400 species, of which 177 have never been cultivated at the Arboretum.From 1946 to 1950 the landscape architect Beatrix Farrand was the landscape design consultant for the Arboretum. Her early training in the 1890s included time with Charles Sprague Sargent and Jackson Thornton Dawson, the chief propagator and superintendent. Today the Arboretum occupies  of land divided between four parcels, viz. the main Arboretum and the Peters Hill, Weld-Walter and South Street tracts. The collections are located primarily in the main Arboretum and on the Peters Hill tract. The Arboretum remains one of the finest examples of a landscape designed by Frederick Law Olmsted. Olmsted's office, now known as the Frederick Law Olmsted National Historic Site, is located in nearby Brookline.

William (Ned) Friedman is the eighth and current Director of the Arnold Arboretum. He is also the Arnold Professor of Organismic and Evolutionary Biology at Harvard University.

The Arnold Arboretum was a key reference for the establishment and development of modern botany in China, in particular the work of Chinese scholars Li Huilin, Wang Qiwu, and Hu Xiuying.

Status within Boston Parks and Harvard University
The Arboretum is privately endowed as a unit of Harvard University. The land was deeded to the City of Boston in 1882 and incorporated into the Olmsted-designed parkway that would become known as the Emerald Necklace. Under the agreement with the city, Harvard University was given a thousand-year lease on the property, and the university, as trustee, is directly responsible for the development, maintenance, and operation of the Arboretum; the City retains responsibility for water fountains, benches, roads, boundaries, and policing. The annual operating budget is largely derived from the endowment, which is based primarily on private philanthropy and managed by the university. Other income is obtained through granting agencies and contributors. All Arboretum staff are University employees.

Location

The Hunnewell Building (which includes the Visitors Center and the Horticultural Library) is located at the main Arborway Gate. This entrance can be accessed on Massachusetts Route 203, a few hundred yards south of its junction with the Jamaicaway. Public transportation to the Arboretum is available on the MBTA Orange Line to its terminus at Forest Hills Station and by bus (#39) to the Monument in Jamaica Plain. The Arboretum is within easy walking distance from either of these points. The Arboretum's southwest gate is very close to the turn between Weld and Walter Streets on the #51 bus line between Cleveland Circle/Reservoir and Forest Hills. The Centre Street entrance, across from Whitcomb Ave and Westchester Road, is served by the #38 bus.

The Arboretum occupies 281 acres in the Jamaica Plain and Roslindale sections of Boston. In 1938, the total area was given as 265 acres, a figure that was reported for decades until being corrected. The Arboretum contains four notable hills: Bussey Hill, Peters Hill, Hemlock Hill, and Weld Hill.

Climate
The Arboretum is located in USDA hardiness zone 6b.

Collections (as of February 2015)
At present, the living collections include 14,980 individual plants (including nursery holdings) belonging to 10,117 accessions representing 3,924 taxa; with particular emphasis on the ligneous species of North America and eastern Asia. Historic collections include the plant introductions from eastern Asia made by Charles Sprague Sargent, Ernest Henry Wilson, William Purdom, Joseph Hers, and Joseph Rock. Recent introductions from Asia have resulted from the 1977 Arnold Arboretum Expedition to Japan and Korea, the 1980 Sino-American Botanical Expedition to western Hubei Province, and more recent expeditions to China and Taiwan.

Comprehensive collections are maintained and augmented for most genera, and genera that have received particular emphasis include: Acer, Fagus, Carya, Forsythia, Taxodium, Pinus, Metasequoia, Lonicera, Magnolia, Malus, Quercus, Rhododendron, Syringa, Paulownia, Albizia, Ilex, Gleditsia and Tsuga. Other comprehensive collections include the Bradley Collection of Rosaceous Plants, the collection of conifers and dwarf conifers, and the Larz Anderson Bonsai Collection. Approximately 500 accessions are processed annually.

The Index Herbariorum code assigned to Arnold Arboretum is A and it is used when citing housed specimens even after integration with Orchid Herbarium of Oakes Ames (AMES) and Gray Herbarium (GH).

Collections policy 

The mission of the Arnold Arboretum is to increase knowledge of the evolution and biology of woody plants. Historically, this research has investigated the global distribution and evolutionary history of trees, shrubs and vines, with particular emphasis on the disjunct species of East Asia and North America. Today this work continues through molecular studies of the evolution and bio-geography of the floras of temperate Asia, North America and Europe.

Research activities include molecular studies of gene evolution, investigations of plant-water relations, and the monitoring of plant phenology, vegetation succession, nutrient cycling and other factors that inform studies of environmental change. Applied work in horticulture uses the collections for studies in plant propagation, plant introduction, and environmental management. This diversity of scientific investigation is founded in a continuing commitment to acquire, grow, and document the recognized species and infraspecific taxa of ligneous plants of the Northern Hemisphere that are able to withstand the climate of the Arboretum's  Jamaica Plain/Roslindale site.

As a primary resource for research in plant biology, the Arboretum's living collections are developed, curated, and managed to support scientific investigation and study. To this end, acquisition policies place priority on obtaining plants that are genetically representative of documented wild populations. For each taxon, the Arnold Arboretum aspires to grow multiple accessions of known wild provenance in order to represent significant variation that may occur across the geographic range of the species. Accessions of garden or cultivated provenance are also acquired as governed by the collections policies herein.

For all specimens, full documentation of both provenance and history within the collection is a critical priority. Curatorial procedures provide for complete and accurate records for each accession, and document original provenance, locations in the collections, and changes in botanical identity. Herbarium specimens, DNA materials, and digital images are gathered for the collection and maintained in Arboretum data systems and the herbarium at the Roslindale site.

Research 
Research on plant pathology and integrated pest management for maintenance of the living collections is constantly ongoing. Herbarium-based research focuses on the systematics and biodiversity of both temperate and tropical Asian forests, as well as the ecology and potential for sustainable use of their resources. The Arboretum's education programs offer school groups and the general public a wide range of lectures, courses, and walks focusing on the ecology and cultivation of plants. Its quarterly magazine, Arnoldia, provides in-depth information on horticulture, botany, and garden history. Current Research Initiatives

Plant records
Plant records are maintained on a computerized database, BG-BASE 6.8 (BG-BASE Inc.), which was initiated in 1985 at the request of the Arnold Arboretum and the Threatened Plants Unit (TPU) of the World Conservation Monitoring Centre (WCMC). Currently the Arboretum utilizes a suite of ESRI Desktop and Mobile GIS software applications to manage, analyze, query, capture, manipulate, and display geographic information. A computer-driven embosser generates records labels. All accessioned plants in the collections are labeled with accession number, botanical name, and cultivar name (when appropriate), source information, common name, and map location. Trunk and/or display labels are also hung on many accessions and include botanical and common names and nativity. Stake labels are used to identify plants located in the Leventritt Garden and Chinese Path.

Grounds maintenance
The grounds staff consists of the manager of horticulture, three arborists, ten horticultural technologists, a foreman, and a gardener. During the summer months ten horticultural interns supplement the grounds staff. A wide array of vehicles and modern equipment, including an aerial lift truck and a John Deere backhoe and front loader, are used in grounds maintenance. Permanent grounds staff, excluding the manager, are members of AFL/CIO Local 615, Service Employees International Union (SEIU).

Nursery and greenhouse facilities
The Dana Greenhouses, located at 1050 Centre Street (with a mailing address of 125 Arborway), were completed in 1962. They comprise four service greenhouses totaling , the headhouse with offices, cold rooms, storage areas, and a classroom. Staffing at the greenhouse includes the manager of greenhouses and nurseries, the plant propagator, two assistants, and, during the summer months, two horticultural interns. Also located in the greenhouse complex is the bonsai pavilion, where the Larz Anderson Bonsai Collection is displayed from the middle of April to the end of October. During the winter months the bonsai are held in the cold storage unit at temperatures slightly above freezing.

Lilac Sunday

The second Sunday in May every year is "Lilac Sunday". This is the only day of the year that picnicking is allowed. In 2008, on the 100th anniversary of Lilac Sunday, the Arboretum website touted:

Associated collections
The Arboretum's herbarium in Jamaica Plain holds specimens of cultivated plants that relate to the living collections (approximately 160,000). The Jamaica Plain herbarium, horticultural library, archives, and photographs are maintained in the Hunnewell building at 125 Arborway; however, the main portions of the herbarium and library collections are housed in Cambridge on the campus of Harvard University, at 22 Divinity Avenue.

Publications
The inventory of living collections is updated periodically and made available to sister botanical gardens and arboreta on request; it is also available on the Arboretum's website (searchable inventory ). Arnoldia, the quarterly magazine of the Arnold Arboretum, frequently publishes articles relating to the living collections. Publication of a journal targeting more scientific audience, Journal of the Arnold Arboretum, established in 1919 with Charles Sprague Sargent as editor-in-chief, was suspended in 1990, when it was incorporated into Harvard Papers in Botany (HPB). The 71 volumes are available online at the Biodiversity Heritage Library. The Journal of the Arnold Arboretum published "notes on trees and shrubs with descriptions of new species and their relationships, letters from correspondents, and notes on the vegetation of countries visited by officers and agents of the Arboretum." Other editors of the journal include Albert Charles Smith, Clarence Emmeren Kobuski, Bernice Giduz Schubert, and Carroll Emory Wood Jr.

A Reunion of Trees
by Stephen A. Spongberg (curator emeritus) recounts the history of the introduction of many of the exotic species included in the Arobretum's collections. New England Natives
written by horticultural research archivist Sheila Connor describes many of the trees and shrubs of the New England flora and the ways New Englanders have used them since prehistoric times. Science in the Pleasure Ground
by Ida Hay (former curatorial associate) constitutes an institutional biography of the Arboretum.

Institutional collaborations
The Arboretum maintains an institutional membership in the American Public Garden Association (APGA), Botanic Gardens Conservation International (BGCI), and the International Association of Botanical Gardens and Arboreta. Additionally, members of the staff are associated with many national and international botanical and horticultural organizations. The Arboretum is also a cooperating institution with the Center for Plant Conservation (CPC), and as an active member of the North American Plant Collections Consortium (NAPCC), it is committed to broadening and maintaining its holdings of: Acer, Carya, Fagus, Stewartia, Syringa, and Tsuga for the purposes of plant conservation, evaluation, and research. The Arboretum is also a member of the North American China Plant Exploration Consortium (NACPEC).

See also 

 The Case Estates of the Arnold Arboretum
 The Landscape Institute at the BAC (formerly operated by the Arnold Arboretum, and before that by Radcliffe College)
 Larz Anderson Bonsai Collection, donated by businessman and ambassador Larz Anderson
 List of botanical gardens in the United States
 List of National Historic Landmarks in Boston
 National Register of Historic Places listings in southern Boston, Massachusetts
 North American Plant Collections Consortium

References

External links

Arnold Arboretum Official Website
Arnold Arboretum Visitor Information
Harvard University Herbaria
American Public Gardens Association (APGA)
Flora of China
Virtual Information Access (VIA) Catalog of visual resources at Harvard University.
Garden and Forest A Journal of Horticulture, Landscape Art, and Forestry (1888–1897)
Boston's Arnold Arboretum: A Place for Study and Recreation, a National Park Service Teaching with Historic Places (TwHP) lesson plan
The Emerald Necklace: Boston's Green Connection, a National Park Service Teaching with Historic Places (TwHP) lesson plan
Arnoldia / Arnold Arboretum at JSTOR Digital Library
Arnoldia / Arnold Arboretum at HathiTrust Digital Library
Arnoldia / Arnold Arboretum at Botanical Scientific Journals

 
Arboreta in Massachusetts
Botanical gardens in Massachusetts
Emerald Necklace
Frederick Law Olmsted works
Harvard University
National Historic Landmarks in Boston
Parks in Boston
1872 establishments in Massachusetts
Landmarks in Boston
National Register of Historic Places in Boston